The Bure is a stream in Italy, tributary of the river Ombrone Pistoiese, which is a tributary of the Arno. Born in the hills just north of the town of Pistoia (the hill of Acquifredola), and is the result of two small streams: the Bure of Baggio and the Bure of Santomoro. The stream is not navigable.

Rivers of Italy
Rivers of Tuscany
Rivers of the Province of Pistoia